Nephopterix habrostola is a species of snout moth in the genus Nephopterix. It was described by Oswald Bertram Lower in 1905 and is known from Australia, including Queensland.

References

Moths described in 1905
Phycitini